Imperia Tower, is a complex located on plot 4 of the MIBC in Moscow, Russia. Construction of the skyscraper started from 2001 to 2002, but halted in 2003 until it was resumed in 2006 and was completed in 2011. The 14-story building started construction in 2013 and is planned to be finished by 2018. The 60-story skyscraper of the complex is the fifteenth-tallest building in Russia, and the 24th-tallest building in Europe.

History 
Construction of the Imperia Tower started from 2001 to 2002, but halted in 2003 due to financial problems. Construction resumed in 2006.

On 22 November 2011, Vladimir Resin, the first deputy mayor of Moscow, opened and commissioned the Imperia Tower to the public.

Construction of the second stage of the Empire complex, a 14-story building, began in 2013 and was planned to finish by 2018.

Overview

Purpose 
The Imperial Tower complex is to serve as mixed-use development, providing 192 apartments, office space, 292 hotel rooms, and a fitness center. In addition, the complex also has 1,500 parking spaces for residents, tourists, and workers. Imperial Tower also has two escalators and thirty elevators.

Design 
The main materials that make up the Imperial Tower complex are glass, steel, and reinforced concrete.

Gallery

Controversy 
Conflicts arose between the investors and developers of the construction of the Imperia Tower complex. In early 2012, the company CJSC Fleyner-City, owned by investor Pavel Fuchs, refused to participate in the joint construction of Imperia Tower with the private offshore Cypriot company Filtrand Properties Ltd., owned by Oleg Grankin, due to inadequate financing of construction by the investor. As a result, on 28 May 2012, Filtrand Properties Ltd. filed an application with the Arbitration Court of Moscow against CJSC Fleyner-City about the recognition of the unilateral refusal of the investing company from this agreement. As a result, after the judicial confrontation the parties on 29 December 2012 signed an agreement, according to which both companies had to transfer more than 20 thousand square meters to the skyscraper.

See also

 List of tallest buildings in Russia
 List of tallest buildings in Europe

References

External links
 Official website
 SkyscraperPage database entry
 Emporis database entry

Moscow International Business Center
Skyscraper office buildings in Moscow
Skyscrapers in Moscow
Residential skyscrapers in Moscow
Skyscraper hotels in Russia